The , or more formally the , was held on 5 June 2016.

The election resulted in victory to the camp supporting Governor Takeshi Onaga who won 27 seats, up from 24 seats before the election. 53.31% turned out in the election, an increase of 0.82% from the historic low turnout in 2012.

Candidates

Campaign 
This election is viewed as crucial to Prime Minister Shinzo Abe's government plan to relocate the Futenma Air Base in Ginowan to Henoko. Governor Takeshi Onaga's camp, which opposes the relocation plan, had 24 seats going into the election.

Results 

|-
! style="background-color:#E9E9E9;text-align:left;" colspan="2" |Alliances and parties
! Votes
! %
! Seats
! Change
|-
| style="background-color:#FF8080" rowspan=6 width=1 |   
| style="text-align:left;" | Social Democratic Party (SDP)
|
|
| 6
| 1
|-
| style="text-align:left;" | Japanese Communist Party (JCP)
|
|
| 6
| 1
|-
| style="text-align:left;" | Okinawa Social Mass Party
|
|
| 3
| 1
|-
| style="text-align:left;" | Yui no Kai
|
|
| 3
| 1
|-
| style="text-align:left;" | Independents
|
|
| 9
| 1
|- style="background-color:#FF8080;"
| style="text-align:left;" | Pro-government coalition
|
|
| 27
| 3
|-
| style="background-color:#F8F400" rowspan=4 width=1 |   
| style="text-align:left;" | Kōmeitō
|
|
| 4
| 
|-
| style="text-align:left;" | Initiatives from Osaka
|
|
| 2
| 
|-
| style="text-align:left;" | Independents
|
|
| 0
| 2
|- style="background-color:#F8F400;"
| style="text-align:left;" | Neutral (politics)
|
|
| 6
| 2
|-
| style="background-color:#77FF9B" rowspan=3 width=1 |   
| style="text-align:left;" width=300| Liberal Democratic Party (LDP)
|
|
| 14
| 1
|-
| style="text-align:left;" width=300| Independents
|
|
| 1
| 
|- style="background-color:#77FF9B;"
| style="text-align:left;" | Opposition coalition
|
|
| 15
| 1
|-
|- style="text-align:right;background-color:#E9E9E9"
|colspan="2"|Totals
|
|
| 48
| 
|- style="text-align:right;background-color:#E9E9E9"
| colspan="2" | Turnout
|
| 53.31%
| 
| 0.82%
|}

Aftermath 
The results is interpreted as a sign of growing opposition against the Henoko move, especially after the murder case involving a US base worker several weeks before the election. There is a renewed push to review the Status of Forces Agreement between the Japanese and American governments, in place since 1960.

The battle for the Okinawa seat in the House of Councillors election in July will be closely watched. The incumbent, Minister for Okinawa Affairs Aiko Shimajiri is expected to face a tough fight against the former mayor of Ginowan Yoichi Iha. The large anti-base rally planned on 19 June can become an indicator of the local voters mood going into 10 July.

References 

2016 elections in Japan
Elections in Okinawa Prefecture
Prefectural assembly elections in Japan
June 2016 events in Japan